Regional 2 East Midlands is an English level 6 rugby union regional league for rugby clubs in the eastern region of the Midlands, including sides from Buckinghamshire, Cambridgeshire, Leicestershire, Northamptonshire, Warwickshire and occasionally Bedfordshire, Derbyshire, Lincolnshire, Nottinghamshire, Oxfordshire, Staffordshire and Worcestershire.  When this division began in 1987 it was known as Midlands 2 East, and has been restructured several times, most notably as a single division known as Midlands 2 between 1992 and 2000, and Midlands 1 East before regionalising again to its present format as part of England Rugby's Future Competition Structure  change at the start of the 2022-23 season.

The champions are promoted to Regional 1 Midlands (formerly Midlands Premier) and the runner-up plays against the second-placed team from Midlands 1 West for the second promotion place. The last three teams are relegated teams to either Midlands 2 East (North) or Midlands 2 East (South), depending on geographic location.

Teams 2022-23

Teams 2021–22

The teams competing in 2021-22 achieved their places in the league based on performances in 2019-20, the 'previous season' column in the table below refers to that season not 2020-21.

2020–21

On 30 October 2020 the RFU announced  that due to the coronavirus pandemic a decision had been taken to cancel Adult Competitive Leagues (National League 1 and below) for the 2020/21 season meaning Midlands 1 East was not contested.

Teams 2019–20

Teams 2018–19

Teams 2017–18

2016-17
Bugbooke
Dronfield (promoted from Midlands 2 East (North))
Huntingdon & District
Ilkeston
Kettering
Leighton Buzzard
Lutterworth (promoted from Midlands 2 East (North))
Market Rasen & Louth
Melton Mowbray (promoted from Midlands 2 East (North))
Newbold-on-Avon (promoted from Midlands 2 West (South))
Northampton Old Scouts
Old Northamptonians (relegated from National League 3 Midlands)
Paviors
Wellingborough

2015–16
Bedford Athletic
Bugbooke
Derby
Huntingdon & District
Ilkeston
Kettering
Market Rasen & Louth
Matlock (promoted from Midlands 2 East (North))
Newark
Newbold-on-Avon (promoted from Midlands 2 West (South))
Northampton Old Scouts (promoted from Midlands 2 East (North))
Old Laurentians (promoted from Midlands 2 West (South))
Paviors
Wellingborough (promoted from Midlands 2 East (South))

2014–15
Bedford Athletic (relegated from National League 3 Midlands)
Belgrave (promoted from Midlands 2 East (North))
Bugbrooke	
Derby
Huntingdon & District	
Ilkeston	
Kettering	
Mansfield
Market Rasen & Louth	
Newark
Old Northamptonians
Paviors
Spalding (promoted from Midlands 2 East (North))
Syston (relegated from National League 3 Midlands)

2013–14
Bugbrooke (promoted from Midlands 2 East (South))
Coalville (promoted from Midlands 2 East (North))
Derby (relegated from National League 3 Midlands)
Huntingdon & District (promoted from Midlands 2 East (South))
Ilkeston
Kettering
Mansfield (relegated from National League 3 Midlands)
Market Rasen & Lough
Matlock
Newark
Old Northamptonians
Paviors
Peterborough
Peterborough Lions

2012–13
Bedford Athletic
Ilkeston
Kettering
Loughborough
Market Bosworth (promoted from Midlands 2 East (North))
Market Rasen and Louth 
Matlock 
Newark 
Paviors
Peterborough
Peterborough Lions 
Spalding 
Towcestrians

2011–12
Bedford Athletic
Coalville
Derby
Ilkeston
Kettering
Leighton Buzzard
Loughborough
Market Rasen and Louth
Matlock
Nuneaton OE
Paviors
Peterborough
Spalding
Towcestrians (promoted from Midlands 2 East (South))

2010–11
Bedford Athletic
Coalville
Derby
Dunstablians
Ilkeston
Kettering
Leighton Buzzard
Mansfield
Matlock
Newark
Paviors
Spalding
Syston
Wellingborough

2009–10
Derby
Dunstablians
Ilkeston
Leighton Buzzard
Mansfield  
Market Bosworth
Matlock
Newark
Old Northamptonians
Paviors
Scunthorpe
Stewarts & Lloyd
Syston
Wellingborough

2008–09
Ampthill promoted as champions to newly formed National Division 3 Midlands.

Ampthill
Derby
Dunstablians
Leighton Buzzard
Mansfield 
Market Bosworth
Matlock
Newark
Paviors
Scunthorpe
Syston
Wellingborough

Original teams

When league rugby began in 1987 this division (known as Midlands 2 East) contained the following teams:

Kettering
Leighton Buzzard
Lincoln
Loughborough
Matlock
Newark
Stamford
Stoneygate
Syston
Vipers
Wigston

Midland 1 East honours

Midlands 2 East (1987–1992)

The original Midlands 2 East (along with its counterpart Midlands 2 West) was a tier 6 league with promotion up to Midlands Premier and relegation down to either East Midlands/Leicestershire or Notts, Lincs & Derbyshire 1.

Midlands 2 (1992–1993)

Restructuring of the Midlands leagues ahead of the 1992–93 season saw Midlands 2 East and Midlands 2 West combined in a single tier 6 division known as Midlands 2.  Promotion continued to Midlands 1 while relegation as now  was now to the newly introduced Midlands East 1.

Midlands 2 (1993–1996)

The top six teams from Midlands 1 and the top six from North 1 were combined to create National 5 North, meaning that Midlands 2 dropped to become a tier 7 league.  Promotion and relegation continued to Midlands Premier and Midlands East 1.

Midlands 2 (1996–2000)

At the end of the 1995–96 season National 5 North was discontinued and Midlands 2 returned to being a tier 6 league.  Promotion and relegation continued to Midlands Premier and Midlands East 1.

Midlands 2 East (2000–2009)

Restructuring ahead of the 2000–01 season saw Midlands 2 split back into two tier 6 regional leagues - Midlands 2 East and Midlands 2 West.  Promotion continued to Midlands 1 while relegation was now to either Midlands 3 East (North) or Midlands 3 East (South) (both formerly part of Midlands East 1).

Midlands 1 East (2009–present)

League restructuring by the RFU meant that Midlands 2 East and Midlands 2 West were renamed as Midlands 1 East  and Midlands 1 West, with both leagues remaining at tier 6.  Promotion was now to National League 3 Midlands (formerly Midlands 1) and relegation to either Midlands 2 East (North) or Midlands 2 East (South).

Promotion play-offs
Since the 2000–01 season there has been a play-off between the runners-up of Midlands 1 East and Midlands 1 West for the third and final promotion place to National League 3 Midlands. The team with the superior league record has home advantage in the tie.  At the end of the 2019–20 season the Midlands 1 East teams have been the most successful with eleven wins to the Midlands 1 West teams eight; and the home team has won promotion on thirteen occasions compared to the away teams six.

Number of league titles

Bedford Athletic (4)
Syston (4)
Kettering (3)
Leighton Buzzard (2)
Scunthorpe (2)
Ampthill (1)
Banbury (1)
Burton (1)
Derby (1)
Dunstablians (1)
Hinckley (1)
Longton (1)
Loughborough Students (1)
Luton (1)
Malvern (1)
Newark (1)
Mansfield (1)
Newbold-on-Avon (1)
Peterborough Lions (1)
South Leicester (1)
Towcestrians (1)
Vipers (1)
Whitchurch (1)

Notes

See also
 Midlands RFU
 East Midlands RFU
 Leicestershire RU
 Notts, Lincs & Derbyshire RFU
 English rugby union system
 Rugby union in England

References

6
2
Sports leagues established in 1987
Recurring sporting events established in 1987
Rugby union in Bedfordshire
Rugby union in Northamptonshire
Rugby union in Leicestershire